The Duchy of Luxemburg was a state of the Holy Roman Empire, the ancestral homeland of the noble House of Luxembourg. The House of Luxembourg, now Duke of Limburg, became one of the most important political forces in the 14th century, competing against the House of Habsburg for supremacy in Central Europe. They would be the heirs to the Přemyslid dynasty in the Kingdom of Bohemia, succeeding the Kingdom of Hungary and contributing four Holy Roman Emperors until their own line of male heirs came to an end and the House of Habsburg got the pieces that the two Houses had originally agreed upon in the Treaty of Brünn in 1364.

In 1443, the duchy passed to Duke Philip the Good of Burgundy of the French House of Valois, and, in 1477, by marriage to Archduke Maximilian I of Austria of the House of Habsburg. The Seventeen Provinces of the former Burgundian Netherlands were formed into an integral union by Holy Roman Emperor Charles V in the Pragmatic Sanction of 1549. In 1795, French revolutionaries ended this situation.

Pre-Duchy

The first known reference to the territory was made by Julius Caesar in his Commentaries on the Gallic War. The historical region of Luxembourg belonged to the Roman province of Belgica Prima. After the invasion of the Germanic tribes from the East, Luxembourg became part of the Frankish Empire. By the 843 Treaty of Verdun, it became part of the Lotharingian province of Middle Francia. According to the Treaty of Ribemont in 880, it had finally fallen to East Francia.

Modern historians explain the etymology of the word Luxembourg as coming from the word Letze, meaning fortification, which might have referred to either the remains of a Roman watchtower or a primitive refuge of the Early Middle Ages.

Proto-Duchy (963–1353)

By the 959 partition of Lotharingia, the Luxembourg region had passed to Duke Frederick I of Upper Lorraine of the House of Ardenne–Bar, a son of Count Palatine Wigeric of Lotharingia. In 963, Count Siegfried, probably a younger brother of Duke Frederick I, purchased some land from Abbot Wikerus of Saint Maximin's in Trier. This land was centered on a ruined (supposedly Roman) fort by the Old High German name of Lucilinburhuc (commonly translated as "little castle"). In the following years, Count Siegfried had a new castle built on the site of these ruins, on a rock that would later be called Bock Fiels. This castle dominated a stretch of the old Roman road linking Reims, Arlon, and Trier, and opened some prospects for trade and taxation. Despite this new construction, it seems that Siegfried and his immediate successors did not make the castle their primary residence. The history of Luxembourg proper began with the construction of this castle.

In the following years, a small town and market grew around the new castle. The first inhabitants were probably servants of Count Siegfried and clergy of Saint Michael's church. This settlement soon received additional protection by the construction of a first, partial city wall and moat.

In addition to the small town near Bock Fiels and the Roman road, another settlement was formed in the Alzette Valley (today the Grund quarter). By 1083, this lower town contained two churches, two bridges of the rivers Alzette, and Petruss. Its inhabitants pursued various professions, including fishing, baking and milling. That same year, the Benedictine abbey of Altmünster was founded by Count Conrad on the hill behind Luxembourg castle.

Henry III was the first count known to have established his permanent residence in Luxembourg castle. In a document from the year 1089, he is referred to as comes Henricus de Lutzeleburg, which also makes him the first documented count of Luxembourg.

Around this fort, the town gradually developed and became the center of a small, but important state of great strategic value to France, Germany, and the Low Countries. Luxembourg's fortress was steadily enlarged and strengthened over the years by successive owners, making the Fortress of Luxembourg one of the strongest in continental Europe. Its formidable defenses and strategic location caused it to become known as the Gibraltar of the North.

The House of Luxembourg provided several Holy Roman Emperors, kings of Bohemia, and archbishops of Trier and Mainz. From the Early Middle Ages to the Renaissance, Luxembourg bore multiple names, including Lucilinburhuc, Lutzburg, Lützelburg, Luccelemburc, and Lichtburg, among others.

The Duchy (1353–1797)

Luxembourg remained an independent fief (county) of the Holy Roman Empire, when, in 1354, Emperor Charles IV elevated it to the status of a duchy for his brother Wenceslaus. The ducal lands had been formed in 1353 by integration of the old County of Luxembourg, the marquisat of Arlon, the counties of Durbuy and Laroche, and the districts of Thionville, Bitburg, and Marville. The county of Vianden can also be included as it had been a vassal of the counts and dukes of Luxembourg since about 31 July 1264.

In 1411, Sigismund of Luxembourg lost the duchy to his niece Elisabeth because he defaulted on a loan. Elizabeth later sold the duchy to the Duke of Burgundy, Philip the Good of the House of Valois-Burgundy, who paid her off in 1444. The dukes of Burgundy had previously acquired a number of other possessions in the Low Countries, including Flanders, Artois, Hainaut, Brabant, Zeeland, Holland, and Namur; Luxembourg and these other Burgundian possessions in the Low Countries are collectively referred to during this period (1384–1482) as the Burgundian Netherlands. The male line of the dukes of Burgundy died out in 1477 when Philip's son Charles the Bold died at the Battle of Nancy, leaving Mary of Burgundy, his only child, as his heiress. After his death, Mary married Archduke Maximilian I of the House of Habsburg, who later became Holy Roman Emperor. The Burgundian Netherlands then came under the rule of the House of Habsburg, beginning the period of the Habsburg Netherlands (1482–1581).

With the abdication in 1555 of Holy Roman Emperor Charles V (also King of Spain Charles I), the Habsburg Netherlands passed to his son King Philip II of Spain. During the Dutch Revolt, or Eighty Years War, the seven northern provinces of the Habsburg Netherlands broke away from Spain to form the Dutch Republic in 1581, while the remaining ten southern provinces (including Luxembourg) remained under Spanish rule until 1714. During this time, the remaining southern provinces were referred to as the Spanish Netherlands (or Southern Netherlands, a name that continued under Austrian rule). The War of the Spanish Succession, which was fought after the Spanish Habsburg line died out in 1700, resulted in the Spanish Netherlands coming under the rule of the Habsburg monarchy of Austria in 1714, thereby beginning the period of the Austrian Netherlands. The area remained under Austrian rule until the French Revolution, when it was taken over by France in 1795. Austria confirmed its loss in the 1797 Treaty of Campo Formio.

Post-Duchy (1797–present)

The Southern Netherlands, including Luxemburg, were annexed by the French First Republic on 1 October 1795 and on 24 October the Forêts  was established from the territory of the Duchies of Luxemburg and the Bouillon. Centred on Luxembourg City, it lay in what is today Belgium, Luxembourg, and Germany. Its name, meaning "forests", comes from the Ardennes forests.

A small amount of the former Luxemburg territory was ceded to Prussia in 1813.

After Napoleon's defeat in 1814 and the Congress of Vienna in 1815 most of Forêts became part of the United Kingdom of the Netherlands, with the part on the east side of the rivers Our and Sauer becoming part of Prussia (now Germany) to satisfy a dynastic claim. Rather than being integrated into the  Netherlands the new Grand Duchy of Luxemburg was established, which was held in a personal union with the Netherlands by King William I. Unlike the Netherlands it became a member of the German Confederation, and a garrison of the Kingdom of Prussia was stationed there.

After the Kingdom of Belgium gained its independence from the Netherlands in 1830, Luxembourg was partitioned in 1839, with the larger western portion of the grand duchy going to Belgium (as the Province of Luxembourg); only the smaller eastern portion remained part of the Grand Duchy. The personal union between the Luxembourg and Dutch thrones continued until the death of William III in 1890, at which time the Dutch throne passed to his daughter Wilhelmina while the Luxembourg throne passed to Adolph of Nassau-Weilburg.

The territory of the former Duchy of Luxembourg is today divided between the Grand Duchy of Luxembourg, the Belgian province of Luxembourg, the German  of Rhineland-Palatinate and the French departments of Ardennes, Meuse and Moselle, the latter part being referred to as  since the 1659 Treaty of the Pyrenees.

Notes

References
 Ermesinde et l'affranchissement de la ville de Luxembourg; Etudes sur la femme, le pouvoir et la ville au XIIIe siècle, sous la direction de Michel Margue, Publications du Musée d'Histoire de la Ville de Luxembourg, Publications du CLUDEM tome 7, Luxembourg 1994.
 Tatsachen aus der Geschichte des Luxemburger Landes, Dr. P. J. Müller, Luxemburg 1963, Verlag "de Frendeskres", Imprimerie Bourg-Bourger.
 Vivre au Moyen Age: Luxembourg, Metz et Trèves; Etudes sur l'histoire et l'archéologie urbaines, sous la direction du Musée d'Histoire de la Ville de Luxembourg, Publications Scientifiques du Musée d'Histoire de la Ville de Luxembourg, tome 2, Luxembourg 1998.

External links

 
Luxemburg
Duchies of the Holy Roman Empire
Seventeen Provinces
Luxemburg
Luxemburg
Luxemburg
States and territories established in the 960s
States and territories established in 1353
States and territories disestablished in 1795
1350s establishments in the Holy Roman Empire
1353 establishments in Europe
1795 disestablishments in the Holy Roman Empire
Former monarchies of Europe